Dynamic Sealing Technologies, Inc. (DSTI) is an American privately held company that designs, manufactures, and integrates fluid rotary union and swivel joint products. The company's rotary union products are used to transfer hydraulic oils, chemicals, water, air, and other various liquids and gasses from stationary inlets to rotating outlets. When assembled with electrical slip rings, the products can also transfer electrical power, signals, and data. Its products have applications in aerospace and defense, alternative energy, construction and agriculture, factory automation, food and beverage, medical, oil and gas, plastic molding, and semiconductor industries in the United States and internationally.

The company is based in the Minneapolis suburb of Andover, Minnesota.

History 
2002: DSTI Founded 

2005: DSTI acquired Scott Rotary Seals (SRS) located in Olean, NY

2007: DSTI acquired Blakeslee Technologies, Inc. (BT)

2011: DSTI was listed to the Inc. 5000 List of America's Fastest-Growing Companies

2012: DSTI expanded facility to 80,000 sq. ft.

2013: DSTI was named a 2013 StarTribune Top Workplace

2015: DSTI was named a 2015 StarTribune Top Workplace

2019: DSTI was named a 2019 StarTribune Top Workplace

2020: DSTI was named a 2020 StarTribune Top Workplace

2021: DSTI was named a 2021 StarTribune Top Workplace

In The Media 
Between 2011 and 2012, DSTI invested over a million dollars towards new equipment as signs pointed to industry growth in key markets. The company positioned itself to have the capacity to respond quickly to meet demand driven by industry uptick.

On January 27, 2012, DSTI held a ribbon cutting ceremony to celebrate its recent expansion going from 36,000-square-feet to 80,000-square-feet allowing more space for manufacturing, quality inspection and shipping.

Close to 1,000 people attended the event, including Gov. Mark Dayton, Rep. Tim Sanders, Rep. Peggy Scott, Sen. Michelle Benson, Anoka County Sheriff James Stuart, Anoka County Attorney Tony Palumbo, Anoka County Commission Board Chairperson Rhonda Sivarajah, the entire Andover City Council, and several Andover city staff.

In 2014, DSTI kicked off its ‘Summer of Giving’ by packing 43,000 meals for Feed My Starving Children, a local non-profit dedicated to feeding children and adults worldwide. The company also partnered with the Memorial Blood Center in a one-day blood drive with over 50 percent participation from its employees.

Subsea Well Response Project 
The Subsea Well Response Project (SWRP) is a joint initiative between several major oil and gas companies, including BP, Chevron, ConocoPhillips, ExxonMobil, Petrobras, Shell, Statoil and Total. All working together to further improve the prevention of, and response to, subsea well-control incidents when immediate shut-in isn't possible.

SWRP selected Oil Spill Response Limited (OSRL) to organize the manufacturing, storing and maintaining of the capping and Subsea Intervention Response Toolkit (SIRT) equipment. A concept to complement a subsea well incident response in scenarios where capping alone is not sufficient to stem the flow of well fluids and to capture and dispose of them in a safe and controlled way.

DSTI designed and manufactured subsea swivels as part of the containment toolkit and was additionally contracted to store and maintain the subsea swivel units until needed in an emergency response.

Resources 


External links
 Official Website

Engineering companies of the United States
Manufacturing companies based in Minnesota